Only Human is the second album by British soul/dance singer Dina Carroll, released in 1996 on the Mercury label.

Overview
The album includes "The Perfect Year", a track which had been a Top 5 single in the UK Singles Chart in 1993, during the long chart run of Carroll's debut album So Close, on which it had not been included. "Escaping" reached No. 3 in the UK, Carroll's joint highest charting single (along with "Don't Be a Stranger"). The follow up double A-sided single "Only Human/Run to You" peaked at number 33. The final single from the album "Living for the Weekend" was only issued on vinyl and promo CD's sent to radio and DJ's peaking at number 1 on the club/dance charts.

Only Human peaked at No. 2 on the UK Albums Chart, the same as its predecessor, selling over 500,000 copies and achieving platinum status.

Reception
A reviewer from Music Week declared the album "a sure winner". Vikki Tobak of Vibe wrote "After establishing herself with her 1993 debut album So Close, Dina Carroll continues to display her own brand of poignant soul with an unconventional sophomore effort".

Track listing 
All tracks composed by Dina Carroll and Nigel Lowis unless stated.

 "Escaping" (Margaret Urlich, Nigel Lowis, B. Blue, R. Smith) 4:45
 "Only Human" (V. Wells, M. Riley) 5:15
 "Give Me the Right" 5:24
 "World Come Between Us" 3:44
 "Love Will Always Bring You Back to Me" 4:17
 "I Didn't Mean to Hurt You" (B. Thiele, M. Roy) 6:24
 "Living for the Weekend" (Dina Carroll, Nigel Lowis, David Morales) 3:30
 "Mind Body & Soul" 4:32
 "Run to You" 5:03
 "Do You Think I'm in Love" 4:06
 "I Don't Want to Talk About It" (Danny Whitten) 5:28
 "The Perfect Year" (Andrew Lloyd Webber, Don Black, Christopher Hampton) 3:46

Singles 
1993 – "The Perfect Year" (UK #5)
1996 – "Escaping" (UK #3)
1996 – "Only Human" / "Run to You" (UK #33)

Credits
Arranged By [Horns] – Nick Ingman (tracks: 3 4 6) 
Arranged By [Strings] – Nick Ingman (tracks: 2 3 4 5 6 12) 
Artwork By – Area 
Backing Vocals – Dina Carroll (tracks: 2, 3, 6 to 10, 12), Ivor Reid (tracks: 6 8), Lance Ellington (tracks: 1 4 5), Marc Reid (tracks: 6 8), Miriam Stockley (tracks: 1 4 5) 
Conductor [Horns] – Nick Ingman (tracks: 3 6) 
Conductor [Strings] – Nick Ingman (tracks: 2 3 5 6 12) 
Engineer – Ren Swan (tracks: 3 6 8 11 12), Rich Lowe (tracks: 1, 2 to 5, 7 to 10) 
Engineer [Assistant] – Andrew Godwin (tracks: 1 to 5, 7 to 10), Tim Wills (tracks: 1, 3 to 8, 10 to 12) 
Guitar – Hugh Burns (tracks: 1 5), Nigel Lowis (tracks: 3 4 9 10) 
Keyboards – Graham Plato (tracks: 3 9 10), Nigel Lowis (tracks: 1 2 4 5 7 8) 
Leader [Strings] – Gavin Wright (tracks: 2 3 5 6 12) 
Mixed By – Bob Clearmountain (tracks: 1 5), Nigel Lowis (tracks: 2 to 4, 6, 8 to 12), Ren Swan (tracks: 3 4 9 10), Rich Lowe (tracks: 8 12) 
Photography – Simon Fowler 
Piano [Grand Piano] – Peter Oxendale (tracks: 5 11 12) 
Producer – Nigel Lowis 
Programmed By – Graham Plato (tracks: 1 to 5, 7 to 10, 11) 
Saxophone – Jimmy Gallagher (tracks: 3 6) 
Strings – London Session Orchestra (tracks: 2 3 5 6 12)

Charts

Weekly charts

Year-end charts

References

Dina Carroll albums
1996 albums
Mercury Records albums